A total solar eclipse will occur on December 26, 2038. A solar eclipse occurs when the Moon passes between Earth and the Sun, thereby totally or partly obscuring the image of the Sun for a viewer on Earth. A total solar eclipse occurs when the Moon's apparent diameter is larger than the Sun's, blocking all direct sunlight, turning day into darkness. Totality occurs in a narrow path across Earth's surface, with the partial solar eclipse visible over a surrounding region thousands of kilometres wide.

Images 
Animated path

Related eclipses 

There are 7 eclipses in 2038 (the maximum possible), included four penumbral lunar eclipses: January 21, June 17, July 16, and December 11.

Solar eclipses of 2036–2039

Saros series 142

Metonic series

References

External links 
 NASA graphics

2038 in science
2038 12 26
2038 12 26